Télétoon la nuit (branded as TÉLÉTOON la Nuit; formerly Le détour sur Télétoon and Télétoon Dechaîne!, then Télétoon Détour) is a Canadian French language late night programming block that targets older teen and adult audiences which airs from 8:00 p.m. to 3:00 a.m. ET/PT every night on the Canadian television channel Télétoon. This block is the French version of Teletoon's Teletoon at Night. It was launched in September 2002 as "Le Détour sur Télétoon" and "Télétoon Dechaîne!" the first being geared towards older adolescents and the former being intended for adults, but in 2005 both blocks were amalgamated as an adult-oriented animated block. On September 1, 2008 it was renamed "Télétoon Détour" and adopted a different art style. The block was revamped once again in September 2009 to "Télétoon la nuit".

The block has continued after April 1, 2019, even though Teletoon at Night (the English version of the block) was discontinued with the move of its programming to the newly launched Adult Swim channel. The English block was since replaced by more kids and family-oriented programming.

Programming

Current programs

The network has been known to broadcast slightly different programming than its English-language counterpart. This is because of differences between the English and French television markets and the differences between each program and their English or French dub's license agreement. For example, South Park and Les Simpson have long been staple programming for Télétoon, while their English language dubs would air on The Comedy Network instead of English Teletoon.

As of March 2023:
 American Dad! (16+)
 Archer (18+)
 Bravest Warriors (8+ in early airings, both on télétoon and télétoon la nuit/13+)
 Family Guy (Euro-French dub had previously aired under the name Les Griffin) (16+, before 13+)
 Les Frères Apocalypse (Doomsday Brothers) (16+)
 Les Histoires bizarres du professeur Zarbi (The Bizarre Stories of Professor Zarbi) (13+)
 La ligue des justiciers: Nouvelle génération (Young Justice) (13+)
 Les Simpson (Also on Noovo) (13+, before 8+ until early 2020 or late 2020)
 Le Télétoon Show (The Télétoon Show) (18+)

Upcoming programs
 Mouvement Deluxe (a.k.a. Deluxe Motion in English format)
 Red Ketchup (April 20, 2023)

Past programs
Programs previously broadcast on Teletoon Dechaine!/Le détour sur Télétoon/Télétoon Détour/Télétoon la nuit:

 Animatrix
 Au pays des Têtes à claques (Knuckleheads) (13+)
 Les Awesomes (The Awesomes) (13+)
 Batman (Batman: The Animated Series) (8+)
 Batman, la relève (Batman Beyond) (8+)
 Bob's Burgers (13+)
 Bob et Margaret (Bob and Margaret) (13+)
 Les Boondocks (The Boondocks) (18+)
 Célibataire Cherche (The Dating Guy) (18+)
 Ciné Maniac (Home Movies) (18+; modern airings would be 13+)
 La Clique (Undergrads) (18+)
 Clone High (18+ on Teletoon Dechaine!/13+ in Reruns)
 La Côte Ouest (The Wrong Coast) (13+)
 Dans l'canyon (Crash Canyon) (13+)
 Daria (13+)
 Les Décalés du cosmos (Tripping the Rift) (16+)
 Les Déchiqueteurs (The Ripping Friends) (13+)
 Les lascars (The homiez) (13+)
 Delta State (13+)
 Faut pas rêver (Fugget About It) (16+)
 Futurama (13+)
 Les Grandes Gueules s'animent! (2 Nuts and a Richard!) (16+)
 Henri pis sa gang (King of the Hill) (13+)
 Malice et menaces (Grim and Evil) (13+)
 Mike Ward Show
 Naruto (13+/18+)
 Nouvelle Ligue des justiciers (Justice League Unlimited) (13+)
 La Patrouille du Temps (Time Squad) (8+)
 Les Pierrafeu (The Flintstones) (G)
 Planète Crue (Daft Planet) (13+)
 Polyvalente Baptiste Huard (Bromwell High) (18+)
 Le P'tit ?%*&$! (Angry Kid) (13+)
 Punch! (13+)
 Quads! de John Callahan (John Callahan's Quads!) (18+)
 Rick et Morty (Rick and Morty) (16+)
 Rick et Steve (Rick & Steve: The Happiest Gay Couple in All the World) (18+)
 Robot Chicken (18+)
 Le Roi de Las Vegas (Father of the Pride) (13+)
 South Park (18+)
 Star ou Boucher (Sons of Butcher) (13+)
 Station X (13+)
 Le Surfer d'Argent (Silver Surfer) (13+)
 Têtes à claques (13+ in early airings/16+ in later airings)
 Les tortues ninja (2012) (Teenage Mutant Ninja Turtles (2012)) (8+)
 Ultimate Spider-Man (13+)
 La vie est un zoo (Life's a Zoo) (16+)
 X-Men'' (13+)

G = Intended for general audiences. Family appropriate viewing. While not necessarily designed for children, it may contain occasional and discreet violence, language or love scenes that are not expected to disturb young children.

8+ = Not intended for children under 8. Contains low intensity violence or thematic elements that are more suitable for viewers who can distinguish fiction from reality.

13+ = Not intended for viewers under 13. Contains dominant mature content that is of moderate intensity. Specifically designed for viewers in this age range who are more discerning about what they view.

16+ = Not intended for viewers under 16. Contains frequent mature content that is of high intensity. Specifically designed for viewers in this age range who have developed the psychological perspective needed to comprehend/process more impactful programming.

18+ = Intended for adult viewing only. Contains explicit subject matter, hyper-realistic violence, graphic language or explicit sexual content.

References

2002 Canadian television series debuts
Television channels and stations established in 2002
2002 establishments in Canada
Television programming blocks in Canada
Canadian late-night television programming
Night